House of Assembly elections were held in Tobago on 29 January 2001 to elect the twelve members of the Tobago House of Assembly. The Tobago Council of the People's National Movement won eight seats with 46.73% of the vote, while the governing National Alliance for Reconstruction won four seats with 38.44% of the vote. This election is the only time to date that the United National Congress participated in an election in Tobago.

Results

References

Tobago
Local elections in Trinidad and Tobago
2001 in Trinidad and Tobago